Mordellistena swezeyi is a species of beetle in the genus Mordellistena of the family Mordellidae. It was described by Calycina Blair in 1928.

References

External links
Coleoptera. BugGuide.

Beetles described in 1928
swezeyi